is a Japanese manga artist, best known for her romantic comedy Strawberry 100% which was published by Shueisha in Weekly Shōnen Jump from 2002 to 2005, and would later receive a television anime and OVA adaptation. During the early part of her career, she wrote and illustrated under the pen name . Her first public work was a dōjinshi called Innocent in 1993. Another series, First Love Limited, was adapted into a 12-episode anime television series and aired in 2009. Other works include Lilim Kiss, Akane-chan overdrive and Anedoki.

Works

References

External links 
 

1971 births
Japanese female comics artists
Female comics writers
Living people
Women manga artists
Manga artists from Shizuoka Prefecture
Japanese women writers